The Weissach axle (pronounced 'Vise-' as in 'advise' and '-ach' with guttural 'ch') is a rear suspension arrangement first used in the Porsche 928 (1978) and echoed in subsequent production models. The fully developed version was used in a Porsche 993 (911) in 1994. The goal of the Weissach axle was to eliminate lift-off oversteer by allowing the rear suspension to adjust itself during cornering manoeuvres and handle both longitudinal and lateral forces.

Name
It is named after the town of Weissach, where the axle was developed at the Porsche research centre. Weissach is also a backronym for Winkel einstellende, selbst stabilisierende Ausgleichs-Charakteristik (angle-adjusting, self-stabilizing equalization characteristic)

Description
The Weissach axle is a variant of the semi-trailing arm suspension. The tendency of a vehicle to oversteer when decelerating is compounded by the compliant bushings found in most trailing arm suspensions.  When the vehicle is decelerating, the trailing arm pivots towards the rear as the wheel is "pulled" backwards relative to the chassis. This results in toe out, which makes the vehicle unstable.

For the Weissach axle, the front pivot bushing of the trailing arm is replaced by a short link. In this arrangement, when the vehicle decelerates and the wheel is "pulled" back, the result is toe in. This adds to stability and thus, reduces oversteer.

Other manufacturers
The rear suspension of the second generation Mazda RX-7 the extra link is not used, a special bushing is used in the same position in the lower control arm to perform a similar function.

References

External links 
 UK Car - Weissach axle description and diagram.
 Porsche 928 history
 Picture

Automotive suspension technologies